Pomerants is a surname. Notable people with the surname include:

 Grigory Pomerants (1918–2013), Russian philosopher and cultural theorist
 Marko Pomerants (born 1964), Estonian politician

See also
 Pomerance
 Pomerantz

Estonian-language surnames